Faster or FASTER may refer to:

Music
 "Faster" (George Harrison song)
 "Faster" (Matt Nathanson song)
 "Faster" (Within Temptation song)
 "Faster" (Manic Street Preachers song), a double A-side single by Manic Street Preachers
 "Faster", a song by Third Eye Blind from the 2003 album Out of the Vein
 "Faster", a song by Janelle Monáe from the album The ArchAndroid

Film
 Faster (2003 film), a 2003 documentary film about MotoGP
 Faster (2010 film), a 2010 feature film

Other
 Someone engaged in fasting
 Isuzu Faster, a model of pick-up truck
 FASTER, stock trading and financial settlement system of New Zealand's Exchange (NZX)
 FASTER (software), a transactional processing system for IBM mainframes
 FASTER (cable system), a communications cable
 FASTER (ESA payload), Facility for Adsorption and Surface Tension; see European Drawer Rack

See also
 Fast (disambiguation)
 Fastest